Screw Loose, released as Svitati in Italy, is a 1999 Italian comedy film produced by Atmosphere Film S.r.l and Wolf Pictures, directed by and starring Ezio Greggio, written by Rudy De Luca and Steve Haberman, and also starring Ezio Greggio, Mel Brooks and Julie Condra. It was released on 15 February 1999.

Plot 
Bernardo Puccini (Ezio Greggio), visits the Italian natural food company, owned by his wealthy but hot-tempered father Guido Puccini (Gianfranco Barra) for a work as a food examiner and flavour developer. He is delighted by the taste of a new cream cheese he had asked, which contains no sugar, fat and preservatives. However, it displeases Guido for the lack of sugar, and he angrily argues with his son for additional chemical additives instead of natural substitutes. He then experiences a heart attack and is taken to the hospital, along with his old-aged doctor, Dr. Caputo (John Karlsen).

In the hospital, Guido recites to Bernardo his history during World War II where the statue of Virgin Mary fell on him and pinned, but was saved by an American soldier named Jake Gordon (Mel Brooks). He tells his son to deliver Jake to him as his last request for a half of his business, and Bernardo unwillingly accepts the request. Sofia (Randi Ingerman), his girlfriend who receives plastic surgery, questions about the request that it doesn't deserve to take the job, but he pursues to fulfill his father's will.

When he arrives at Los Angeles, California, he visits the mental hospital where Jake Gordon is located, who was discovered as delusional from a day after the war he had experienced. Nevertheless, Dr. Barbara Collier (Julie Condra) and her father Dr. Hugo (Robert Dawson) refuses him because Jake is unpredictable to be released. After that, he sneaks to make Jake remember that Jake had saved his father, and to break him free. They are able to escape the hospital after they push the mental patients on wheelchairs as a diversion to gate guards, but are discovered by Dr. Barbara and Dr. Hugo, who orders her to retrieve him back.

As they arrive in Italy, Jake offers Bernardo a drink that he dissolved five sedative pills. Bernardo unknowingly downs it, causing him to become perplexed in arrival terminal. They are soon found by Dr. Barbara Collier, and Jake steals Bernardo's wallet (which he falsely thinks that Bernardo Puccini photo is him) and quickly escapes to Monte Carlo, Monaco. After he is recovered, Bernardo confronts Dr. Collier that he should bring Jake to his father to fulfil the request, but Collier wants him to return to the mental hospital when Dr. Hugo holds her responsibility for letting the patient go.

Bernardo and Collier arrive in Monte Carlo, and enter the hotel where unidentified Jake had checked in. Bernardo replies the lobby his own name that Jake used from his purloined wallet. The lobby tells them that he is out to the beach, and Bernardo finds him covering the topless female sunbathers with hand towels. He removes them, but accidentally includes a sensitive, aged sunbather, who calls the police due to his perversion. After he was released from prison by Collier, Bernardo's twitching sensation is increasing, and he proves to her that having Jake with him turns him insane every time Jake causes trouble. In the diner, Collier advises him to stay calm so he will be fine. When he hears the piano tune and is annoyed by twitches, he rushes for it and finds Jake. When Jake finds Collier, he departs the building, causing Bernardo to chase after him, but causing the police to follow them.

Bernardo is feebly pinned down by the statue of Virgin Mary, which Jake reminds him about the incident. They finally sidestepped from police chase, but Jake is handcuffed by Collier who demands to take him with her. Bernardo does not surrender and sets up the trap, installing a fake corridor in the airport, which turns out to be a truck carrying Jake away. But again he was arrested. In the police station, Bernardo madly retells what Jake had been abusing him and what Jake had performed compulsive acts all along. Dr. Collier feels remorse about his sanity, so she allows him and Jake to depart back to Italy.

As Bernardo and Jake meet Guido, whose heart condition is recuperating, Guido strangles Jake for revenge because of the death of his wife. Bernardo breaks them apart, and Jake states his reason of vengeance that he had married Jiovana who happens to be Guido's wife, but realized that she is a he. Sofia approaches with her newly surgicated body parts, and tells the police to arrest Jake for his insanity. Dr. Collier intervenes and declares Jake a "free man", so he is released. Bernardo scolds Sofia for her abnormal femininity and her plastic surgery obsession, and dumps her. He then persuades his father to take over the factory. Guido asks to call over Dr. Caputo, but his son realizes that he is dead. Bernardo later falls in love with Dr. Collier while Jake enjoys his marching dance with other patients.

Later, Bernardo becomes Collier's husband and Jake's assistant, but then pretends to dislike the cream cheese the way Guido did. He visits Jake in the office, and grows headache. Jake uses a "relocating pain" again by hitting Puccini's leg with a golf club. Bernardo runs away while Jake tries to finish the "treatment".

Cast 
Ezio Greggio - Bernardo Puccini
Mel Brooks - Jake Gordon
Julie Condra - Dr. Babara Collier
Gianfranco Barra - Guido Puccini
Randi Ingerman - Sofia
John Karlsen - Dr. Caputo
Enzo Iacchetti - the Factory Guard
Robert Dawson - Dr. Hugo
Sofia Milos - the woman in airport

Production

References

External links 

1999 films
1999 comedy films
English-language Italian films
Films directed by Ezio Greggio
Films set in Italy
Films set in Monaco
Films set in the United States
Italian comedy films
Films with screenplays by Rudy De Luca
1990s English-language films